Duck Creek Township is a township in Wilson County, Kansas, United States.

History
Duck Creek Township was established in 1871.

References

Townships in Wilson County, Kansas
Townships in Kansas